Oevstedalia is a genus of fungi of uncertain placement in the subphylum Pezizomycotina. This is a monotypic genus, containing the single lichen species Oevstedalia antarctica. The genus was circumscribed by Damien Ertz and Paul Diederich in 2004. Previously classified in the Dothideomycetes, Oevstedalia was moved to Pezizomycotina incertae sedis due to the lack of DNA data available for the genus.

The genus name Oevstedalia honours Dag Olav Øvstedal (b. 1944), a Norwegian botanist (lichenology and mycology), who worked at the University of Bergen.

References

Pezizomycotina
Monotypic Ascomycota genera
Lichen genera
Taxa described in 2004